Kaycee Grogan is an R&B singer who was signed to Columbia Records in the 1990s. Her debut single "It's Alright" was released in 1996, and charted on the Billboard Hot 100 chart.

References

American contemporary R&B singers
Living people
Columbia Records artists
Year of birth missing (living people)
Place of birth missing (living people)
20th-century American women singers
20th-century American singers